Danela Arsovska (Macedonian: Данела Арсовска) is a Macedonian politician and academic and the current mayor of Skopje since 2021. In 2014, she was elected as President of the Macedonian Chambers of Commerce, which is the union of national chambers of commerce, promoting economic cooperation on national and international level based on principles of free trade and fair competition. She was appointed Chair of the Macedonian Union of Employers’ Organizations in 2015.

On national level Arsovska is Representative in the Assembly of the Republic of North Macedonia National Council for European Integration since 2016. She is also Member of the Public Private Partnership Council in the Government of the Republic of North Macedonia.

Education 
Arsovska obtained a bachelor's degree in law in Skopje at the Ss. Cyril and Methodius University. She has a master's degree in economics and an executive education from the University of Oxford and University of Sheffield.

She holds a range of academic and consulting positions in North  Macedonia and internationally, and has lectured on development topics at universities and conferences  Arsovska is fluent in Macedonian, English, German and also speaks Bulgarian and Serbian.

International career 
Arsovska holds several high-level positions in international intergovernmental organizations and also hold a range of expert positions. She serves on the Panel at The World Bank ICSID in Washington, USA since 2016. In 2017 she was appointed as Court Member at the OSCE Court of Conciliation and Arbitration in Geneva, Switzerland and is also Court Member of the Permanent Court of Arbitration in The Hague, Netherlands since 2017.

Arsovska is the Macedonian representative in the International Chamber of Commerce (ICC) and elected General Council Member in the World Chambers Federation

Awards and recognitions 
As recognition of her work in 2018 the World Business Angels Investment Forum awarded Arsovska as “Best Business Woman Role Model of South East Europe”.  In 2019 at the 6th Entrepreneurs Summit of Central and Southeast Europe, Arsovska was awarded with the Recognition for her special contribution to the entrepreneurship development. In 2020 Arsovska was awarded with Certificate of Merit by Kunio Mikuriya, Secretary General of the World Customs Organization, as recognition for her contribution to customs development. The recognition was presented by the Director General of the Macedonian Customs Administration.

Political career

2021 local elections 
In the run-up for the local elections in North Macedonia scheduled for 17 and 31 October 2021, Danela Arsovska points out her candidacy as an independent candidate for mayor of Skopje. In a very short of time she collect the number of citizens signatures required for official candidacy. Being the independent candidate, she received also a support from the largest opposition party in North Macedonia VMRO - DPMNE and its coalition partners from the Albanian political bloc: Alliance for Albanians and Alternativa, as well from a number of well-known Skopje intellectuals, artists and prominent citizens.

During the campaign, the ruling SDSM party presented documents claiming Bulgarian citizenship to Danela and her husband. Arsovska herself has denied these claims. The premier Zoran Zaev has expected Arovska to withdraw from the local elections. Per Zaev himself her Bulgarian citizenship was a problem: political, ethical, dishonest. At the same time, a reference on the website of the Bulgarian Ministry of Interior has confirmed the authenticity of the data from the ID cards of the couple. On this occasion, the Ministry of Foreign Affairs of Bulgaria expressed an official protest, insisting hate speech against Bulgaria is a denial of the European values.

Despite the campaign against her, Arsovska was elected a mayor of the city.

References 

1979 births
Ss. Cyril and Methodius University of Skopje alumni
21st-century economists
Living people
Mayors of Skopje